= Angelini Tower =

Coordinates: 10.5667°N 71.7333°W

- Interactive map of the Angelini Tower area

General information
- Status: Completed
- Type: Residential
- Location: Maracaibo, Venezuela
- Construction started: 2006
- Completed: 2009

Height
- Roof: 100.5 m (330 ft)

Technical details
- Floor count: 29
- Lifts/elevators: 12

The Angelini Tower is a 29-story residential skyscraper located in the metrópoli of Maracaibo, Zulia state, Venezuela.

It is the tallest skyscraper in the metrópoli and the Zulia state, having a height of 100 meters.
